Cochylichroa viscana is a species of moth of the  family Tortricidae. It is found in North America, where it has been recorded from Illinois, Iowa, Maryland, New Jersey, North Carolina, Quebec and Tennessee.

The wingspan is about 13 mm. Adults have been recorded on wing from May to September.

Cochylichroa viscana was formerly a member of the genus Cochylis, but was moved to the redefined genus Cochylichroa in 2019 as a result of phylogenetic analysis.

References

Tortricinae
Moths described in 1907